Edward Roy "Eddie" Patten (August 27, 1939 – February 25, 2005) was an American R&B/soul singer, best known as a member of Gladys Knight & the Pips. He was a cousin of Gladys Knight. Patten was a member of the group from 1959 until its disbandment in 1989. Patten was a multiple Grammy Award winner, and along with the group, he was inducted to the Rock and Roll Hall of Fame in 1996.

Edward was born in Atlanta, Georgia, to Thomas S. Patten and Wilhelmina (née Maxwell). His father was a local musician, singer and a child prodigy on the piano. Edward grew up singing in the church and with local "doo wop" groups in Atlanta. While still a teenager, he married his first wife Katherine (née Smith) in Atlanta at the home of her parents. He had two children from this marriage, Stephanie A. and Steven A. Patten. It was in Atlanta that he was invited by William Guest to join the Pips after two members left the group to get married. Edward later traveled first to New York after the success of the single "Every Beat of My Heart", and later he and the group, now Gladys Knight and the Pips, moved to Detroit, Michigan, to join Motown Records. By this time the strain of the entertainment world had taken its toll on his marriage, and he and Katherine divorced, and he married Renee (née Brown). He and Renee had three children - Edward II, Elliott and Renee Patten.

Even though Gladys Knight & the Pips officially disbanded in 1989, Patten remained very close to his bandmates and his lifelong friends throughout the rest of his life.

Patten had diabetes and hypertension and was later incapacitated by a stroke. He died at age 65 of a stroke at St. Mary's Mercy Hospital in Livonia, Michigan, where he resided. He is interred at Detroit's historic Woodlawn Cemetery at Eight Mile Road and Woodward Avenue.

References

External links

1939 births
2005 deaths
Musicians from Atlanta
American soul musicians
Gladys Knight & the Pips members
Knight family (show business)
20th-century American singers
Burials at Woodlawn Cemetery (Detroit)
American amputees
20th-century African-American male singers
American rhythm and blues singers
American soul singers
20th-century American male singers
21st-century African-American people